Sphinctrinopsis is a lichen genus in the family Caliciaceae. The genus, distributed in the former USSR, is monotypic, containing the single species Sphinctrinopsis pertusariae.

References

Lichen genera
Caliciales genera
Taxa described in 1927